Victim of Society (German: Opfer der Gesellschaft) is a 1919 German silent drama film directed by Willy Grunwald and starring Conrad Veidt and Kurt Brenkendorf. Originally shot in 1918, the film was not released until 1919. It is now considered a lost film.

Cast
 Conrad Veidt as Prosecutor Chrysander 
 Vilma Born-Junge as Martha Bellina, seine Mutter
 Anneliese Halbe as Chrysanders Verlobte
 Kurt Brenkendorf
 Willy Grunwald
 Carl Wallauer

References

Bibliography
 Jung, Uli & Schatzberg, Walter. Beyond Caligari: The Films of Robert Wiene. Berghahn Books, 1999.

External links

1919 films
Films of the Weimar Republic
German silent feature films
Films directed by Willy Grunwald
German drama films
1919 drama films
UFA GmbH films
German black-and-white films
Lost German films
Silent drama films
1910s German films
1910s German-language films